The flower scorpionfish (Hoplosebastes armatus) is a species of marine ray-finned fish belonging to the family Scorpaenidae, the scorpionfishes. It is native to the Pacific Ocean around Japan and to the East China Sea.  This species grows to a length of  SL.  This species is the only known member of its genus.

References

Scorpaenini
Monotypic fish genera
Fish described in 1929